Yuan Zai is a female giant panda born at the Taipei Zoo on July 6, 2013. She is the first panda cub born in Taiwan, to parents Tuan Tuan and Yuan Yuan by artificial insemination. As Tuan Tuan and Yuan Yuan were sent to Taiwan from People's Republic of China in exchange for two Formosan sika deer and two Taiwan serows, Yuan Zai does not need to be returned.

The female baby was first nicknamed "Yuan Zai" by the zookeepers soon after birth. On October 26, at the zoo's 99th anniversary ceremony, the baby panda was officially named Yuan Zai after a naming activity that saw 60% of the votes go to the cub's nickname. The name "Yuan Zai" can be interpreted variously as "the little round thing", "rice ball", or "(Yuan) Yuan's child". On the same day, she was also presented an honorary citizen's card.

Media and public attention
Yuan Zai was separated from her mother Yuan Yuan for her first month due to an inadvertent injury inflicted upon her by the first time mother. The two were reunited on 13 August 2013.

On January 6, 2014, Yuan Zai made her public debut at the giant panda house located in the zoo.

In March 2014, Yuan Zai was featured in another popular video showing Yuan Yuan towing the baby back to bed.

References

External links

 Taipei Zoo
 Taipei Zoo YouTube Channel

Individual giant pandas
Taipei Zoo
Animals as diplomatic gifts
Animals on the Internet
2013 animal births